Gordon Nornable MC (9 January 1915 – 4 November 2002) won the Military Cross and Croix de Guerre in 1944 fighting with the French Maquis in eastern France.

Biography
Nornable was born at Woodseats, Sheffield, the son of Charles Ernest Nornable. He was educated locally at King Edward VII School where he excelled at sport (his father had played cricket for Derbyshire).

In April 1940, he joined the London Scottish as a regimental police officer. In July 1942, he was drafted to the 6th Battalion, Gordon Highlanders, and volunteered to undertake commando missions for the Special Service in France. He was commissioned on the General List in March 1944, having previously been a sergeant. In June 1945, as a lieutenant, he transferred back to the Gordons. He was awarded the Military Cross in June 1945.

Apart from his military service, he was a local government officer with Sheffield Public Works Department from 1934 until he retired in 1975. In retirement, Nornable lived at Norton, Sheffield, where he died aged 87.

References

External links
An account by Nornable of his time with the Maquis, King Edward VII School Magazine, vol. XI. July, 1946 No. 12, page 185

People educated at King Edward VII School, Sheffield
1915 births
2002 deaths
British Army Commandos soldiers
London Scottish soldiers
Gordon Highlanders officers
Recipients of the Military Cross
British Army personnel of World War II
Gordon Highlanders soldiers
British Army General List officers
British Special Operations Executive personnel
Military personnel from Sheffield
Recipients of the Croix de Guerre 1939–1945 (France)